The 2022 Oceania Women's Sevens Championship was held in Pukekohe, New Zealand on 24–26 June. It was the eleventh edition of the Oceania Championship in women's rugby sevens.

The competition served as one of the final events for Oceania Rugby national teams ahead of the Commonwealth Games in July and the Sevens World Cup in September. It was played as a double round-robin format at Navigation Homes Stadium.

Black Ferns Ma won the tournament, with Australia VII Selection as runner-up.

Teams 
Four women's teams competed at the 2022 tournament:

 Black Ferns Ma
 Black Ferns Pango
 Australia Selection
 Fijiana

Standings

Tournament

Round 1

Round 2

Round 3

Round 4

Round 5

Round 6

Placings

See also 

 2022 Oceania Sevens Championship (for men's teams)

References 

2022
2022 in women's rugby union
2022 rugby sevens competitions
2022 in Oceanian rugby union
2022 in New Zealand rugby union
International rugby union competitions hosted by New Zealand
June 2022 sports events in New Zealand